Carlos Alberto Zolim Filho, best known as Carlitos (born in Porto Alegre, Rio Grande do Sul; November 27, 1921 – 2001) was a Brazilian footballer.

Achievements
With Tesourinha and Adãozinho formed most invaluable three striker attack of the 1940s, a team known as the "Road Roller". He played entire career (1938–1951) at Sport Club Internacional, and scored 485 goals. He is still to this date the top scorer in the club history. He won ten Campeonato Gaúcho, eight consecutive (1940–48, 1950 and 1951). He died at 79 years old.

References 

1921 births
2001 deaths
Brazilian footballers
Association football forwards
Sport Club Internacional players
Footballers from Porto Alegre